The Ada Thompson Memorial Home was a home for indigent elderly women at 2021 South Main Street in Little Rock, Arkansas.  Founded in 1882 by prominent local citizens, it served in that capacity until 1976.  The surviving building, a two-story brick building with Beaux Arts, Colonial Revival, and Georgian Revival features, was built in 1900 to a design by Frank Gibb and Theodore Sanders.  The home was named in honor of Ada Thompson Crutchfield, who gave a major bequest to the organization in honor of her parents.

The building was listed on the National Register of Historic Places in 1977.

See also
National Register of Historic Places listings in Little Rock, Arkansas

References

Residential buildings on the National Register of Historic Places in Arkansas
Colonial Revival architecture in Arkansas
Residential buildings completed in 1909
Individually listed contributing properties to historic districts on the National Register in Arkansas
National Register of Historic Places in Little Rock, Arkansas
1909 establishments in Arkansas